Sebastian Darke is the eponymous hero of a series of children's novels written by British author Philip Caveney.

The novels
Sebastian Darke: Prince of Fools, was first published in the UK in January 2007.
Sebastian Darke: Prince of Pirates, was published in February 2008.
Sebastian Darke: Prince of Explorers, was published in 2009.
A Buffalope's Tale, published 2010.

Spin-offs
A Buffalope's Tale, a fantasy novel by Philip Caveney, is a spin-off in the Sebastian Darke series. The official Sebastian Darke website includes the first chapter, entitled The Great Migration.

References

External links
 SebastianDarke.co.uk Official Sebastian Darke site
 Sebastian Darke: Prince of Fools on Philip Caveney's website
 Sebastian Darke: Prince of Pirates on Philip Caveney's website
 Sebastian Darke: Prince of Explorers on Philip Caveney's website

Fantasy novel series
Series of children's books